Mildred Amooti Tuhaise is a Ugandan news anchor and news reporter at NBS Television. She is  the founder of Girls Incorporated Uganda a Non Government Organisation in Kampala

Early life and education 
Tuhaise was born  in Masindi. She studied from Asaba Primary School in  Masindi for PLE, Kawempe Mbogo Muslim Secondary School for O level and A Level at St Peters Naalya. She later joined Makerere University where she acquired a Bachelor of Science in Information Technology.

Career 
In 2006, Tuhaise began her career in the media as a voice-over in adverts, news at Top TV (2008-2012). She then moved on to WBS TV as a news anchor (2012-2015) and in April 2015, she joined NBS TV where she does news anchoring (NBS at One), talk show host (Morning Breeze) and as a news reporter.

Personal life 
She serves as the CEO of Girls Incorporated Uganda a Non Government Organisation in Kampala.

References

External links 

Living people
People from Kampala
Ugandan women journalists
Ugandan journalists
Ugandan television journalists
Ugandan women television journalists
1990 births